Love Live! Sunshine!! is a 2016 anime television series produced by Sunrise and is the follow-up to the 2013 anime series, Love Live! School Idol Project. Taking place at Uranohoshi Girls' Academy, Chika Takami, a girl who became a fan of the school idol group μ's, decides to follow in their footsteps and form her own school idol group, Aqours. The first season aired in Japan between July 2 and September 24, 2016 and was simulcast by Funimation, Crunchyroll, and Madman Entertainment. An English dub by Funimation began streaming from July 30, 2016.

A second season aired  from October 7 to December 30, 2017 and was also simulcast by Crunchyroll and dubbed by Funimation. "Aozora Jumping Heart" is used as the opening theme for the final episode.

The first Blu-ray disc of the series, containing the first episode of the anime, was released on September 27, 2016. The limited edition contained a balloting ticket for Aqours' first concert, an original song CD, a newly written novel by Sakurako Kimino, a Love Live! School Idol Festival themed UR rarity sticker, a card for Love Live! School Idol Collection, a PR card, and an 8-page booklet. An anime film, Love Live! Sunshine!! The School Idol Movie Over the Rainbow, was released in Japan on January 4, 2019.


Episode list

Season 1

Season 2

Notes

References

Lists of anime episodes
Love Live!